WIID may refer to:

 WIID (FM), a radio station (88.1 FM) licensed to serve Rodanthe, North Carolina, United States; see List of radio stations in North Carolina
 Kemayoran Airport (ICAO code WIID)